TDRS-8, known before launch as TDRS-H, is an American communications satellite, of second generation, which is operated by NASA as part of the Tracking and Data Relay Satellite System. It was constructed by Boeing is based on the BSS-601 satellite bus.

Launch

Its launch was contracted by International Launch Services, using an Atlas IIA launch vehicle. The launch occurred on 30 June 2000, at 12:56:00 UTC from Launch Complex 36A at the Cape Canaveral Air Force Station.

It was the first Tracking and Data Relay Satellite, of second generation, to be launched. Due to a malfunction of the multiple-access phased array antenna the spacecraft did not provide the expected level of performance for eighteen of the communications services that it was to provide. The same problem was found and corrected on the TDRS-9 and TDRS-10 satellites prior to their launches.

Orbit
Following its launch, it raised itself into geostationary orbit by means of its onboard R-4D apogee motor, and was positioned at 150.0° West for on-orbit testing. After testing was complete, it was moved to 171.0° West from where it provides communications services to spacecraft in Earth orbit, including the Space Shuttle and International Space Station.

See also

 2000 in spaceflight
 List of TDRS satellites

External links

 
 
 
 

Communications satellites in geostationary orbit
Satellites using the BSS-601 bus
Spacecraft launched in 2000
TDRS satellites
Spacecraft launched by Atlas rockets